GURPS Traveller is a set of table-top role-playing game books by Steve Jackson Games, designed to allow game play in the Third Imperium science-fiction setting from the original Traveller using the GURPS rule system. Loren Wiseman (formerly of Game Designers' Workshop) wrote the core book for GURPS Traveller and served as line editor.

History 
Steve Jackson had been a long-time fan of Traveller, and had previously talked to Digest Group Publications about doing a GURPS Traveller back in the late 1980s. Following the dissolution of GDW in 1996, Jackson licensed the Traveller property from Marc Miller, while Miller simultaneously licensed Traveller to Imperium Games. Jackson brought on Loren Wiseman to produce the new game, which was set in an alternate history of the classic Traveller timeline (which was at the time licensed to Imperium Games). Following its publication, GURPS Traveller was extensively supported with numerous background books through 2003, and the Journal of the Travellers Aid Society was resurrected as a Pyramid-like online magazine in 2000.

The game uses the GURPS (Third Edition) system and takes place in an alternate timeline in which no Rebellion occurred and the Virus was never released. Steve Jackson Games has produced over 30 high-quality supplements for the line, including details for all of the major races, many of the minor races, interstellar trade, expanded world generation, the military forces of the Third Imperium, and starships. The game is often referred to as "GT". Loren Wiseman who worked with Game Designers' Workshop in the design and development of Traveller was the GURPS Traveller line manager and editor of the online magazine Journal of the Travellers Aid Society.

In August 2007, Mongoose Publishing announced changes in Traveller license and a strongly supported reintroduction of the Traveller system: Steve Jackson Games licence for the Journal of the Travellers Aid Society runs until the end of 2011.  The distribution of GURPS Traveller products by Steve Jackson Games finally ceased at the end of 2015.

Difference between Classic Traveller and GURPS Traveller 

Loren Wiseman and Jon Zeigler have attempted to keep the information, equipment, characters, style, and atmosphere of GURPS Traveller as close as possible to the original Classic Traveller universe. However, the use of the GURPS rules means there are several differences between playing GURPS Traveller as opposed to the original Classic Traveller.

 GURPS has a point-based character creation system rather than the essentially random system of Classic Traveller. The GURPS system ensures that all characters in a group will be roughly equal in terms of abilities and skills, while in the original game it was in principle possible for a character to die during creation, through risks taken during his previous career, and the characters of the different players could be very different in power and abilities. On the other hand, the essentially random nature of the character creation system of CT which could often spark a player's imagination in unexpected ways: whereas in Classic Traveller a player would generate a character and then produce a back story to match the rolled characteristics, character creation in GURPS involves choosing a backstory and then creating a character to match.
 Because Traveller was conceived in the 1970s it strongly resembles science-fiction from the late 1960s. People who want to play GURPS Traveller and still keep their game universe more in line with what we currently picture the future to be like can quite simply add equipment to their game world from other GURPS sourcebooks.  The GURPS Traveller main rulebook detailed the assumptions and restrictions that would be required in order to keep GT like the original game but also had some speculation on what changes to that model would do to the setting.
 The GURPS game system is more detailed than the original Traveller game system. GURPS describes game effects and character point values for advantages such as above average hearing and variable-gravity tolerance and disadvantages such as motion sickness and color blindness. The original Traveller game system did not provide game mechanics effects for advantages or disadvantages.
 Until 1998 the original Traveller books had been out of print for over a decade. Also, the small size and amount of the books meant there wasn't as much information on the universe as many people would have liked. Steve Jackson Games has already printed more material for Traveller's Imperium setting than Game Designers' Workshop ever did, with more pictures, starship deck plans, and details of the game universe.
 Character advancement works very differently in GURPS Traveller. The original Traveller system had very limited mechanics for improving skills or abilities, and in practice, characters were rewarded through the exploration of the setting and monetary gains rather than through more traditional character advancement. GURPS allows for much more dynamic character advancement.

Fourth edition GURPS 
The core GURPS ruleset was updated to a streamlined version with the August 2004 release of its fourth edition. In February, 2006, Steve Jackson Games released GURPS Traveller: Interstellar Wars. This book includes updated versions of the most essential mechanics found in the third edition books, including system generation, starship construction, starship combat, and interstellar trade.

The book also presents a new setting. Prior books in the GURPS Traveller line were set in an alternate timeline of the Third Imperium where the Rebellion did not take place - around the year 1120 (since the founding of the Imperium). GURPS Traveller: Interstellar Wars is set almost 2500 years prior to the founding of the Third Imperium, with a default year of A.D. 2170. The humans from Earth finally invent a faster-than-light drive for their space ships. They soon make first-contact with extraterrestrial aliens, and those aliens are human. The Interstellar Wars was intended as a much more dynamic campaign setting than the essentially static background of the Third Imperium offered in previous GURPS Traveller publications.

Publications 

 provides details about the human-descended Zhodani and the alien Vargr, as well as three minor races.
 provides details about the Aslan, K'kree, and three minor alien races.
 provides details about the Hivers, Drones, and two minor alien races.
 provides details for 16 intelligent alien races from across space.
GURPS Traveller: Behind the Claw
GURPS Traveller: Deck Plan 1 Beowulf-Class Free Trader
GURPS Traveller: Deck Plan 2 Modular Cutter
GURPS Traveller: Deck Plan 3 Empress Marava-Class Far Trader
GURPS Traveller: Deck Plan 4 Assault Cutter
GURPS Traveller: Deck Plan 5 Sulieman-Class Scout/Courier
GURPS Traveller: Deck Plan 6 Dragon-Class System Defense Boat
GURPS Traveller: Droyne Coyn Set 
GURPS Traveller: Far Trader
GURPS Traveller: First In
GURPS Traveller: Flare Star PDF
GURPS Traveller: GM's Screen
GURPS Traveller: Ground Forces
GURPS Traveller: Heroes 1 - Bounty Hunters
GURPS Traveller: Humaniti
GURPS Traveller: Imperial Navy 
GURPS Traveller: Interstellar Wars (see above)
GURPS Traveller: Modular Cutter
GURPS Traveller: Nobles
GURPS Traveller: Planetary Survey 1 - Kamsii
GURPS Traveller: Planetary Survey 2 - Denuli
GURPS Traveller: Planetary Survey 3 - Granicus
GURPS Traveller: Planetary Survey 4 - Glisten
GURPS Traveller: Planetary Survey 5 - Tobibak
GURPS Traveller: Planetary Survey 6 - Darkmoon
GURPS Traveller: Psionics Institutes PDF 
GURPS Traveller: Rim of Fire
GURPS Traveller: Star Mercs
GURPS Traveller: Starports
GURPS Traveller: Starships
GURPS Traveller: Sword Worlds
Steve Jackson Games also published the Journal of the Travellers' Aid Society, the official magazine of Traveller.

Reception

References 

Traveller
Role-playing game supplements introduced in 1998
Space opera role-playing games
Traveller (role-playing game)